The Clark County District Attorney is the elected district attorney of Clark County, Nevada. The current Clark County District Attorney is Steven B. Wolfson.

As of 2021, the Clark County District Attorney's Office employs approximately 170 attorneys and over 500 support staff. It is divided into four divisions: criminal, juvenile, family support, and civil.

Past district attorneys

References 

District attorneys in Nevada
Government of Clark County, Nevada